Ta Baen is a khum (commune) of Svay Chek District in Banteay Meanchey Province in north-western Cambodia.

Villages

 Kouk Ta Aek
 Ou Veaeng
 Ta Baen
 Kouk Roka
 Ou Veaeng Tboung

References

Communes of Banteay Meanchey province
Svay Chek District